Hallelujah! was recorded during the Mormon Tabernacle Choir's 2015 Christmas shows in the LDS Conference Center, with special guests Broadway star Laura Osnes, actor Martin Jarvis, and guest soloists from the Metropolitan Opera (Erin Morley, Tamara Mumford, Ben Bliss, Tyler Simpson).  An album and concert DVD was released on October 7, 2016. The album will be broadcast on WMHT-FM on December 11, 2016.  The recorded concert premiered on PBS on December 19, 2016.

Track listing

References

2016 Christmas albums
Christmas albums by American artists
Tabernacle Choir albums